KQEL (107.9 FM, "Cool FM") is a radio station licensed to serve Alamogordo, New Mexico.  The station is owned by Burt Broadcasting, Inc.  It airs a classic hits music format.

The station was assigned the KQEL call letters by the Federal Communications Commission on May 4, 2004.

References

External links

QEL
Classic hits radio stations in the United States
Radio stations established in 2004